Amor vuol sofferenza is a 1739 commedia per musica in three acts by Leonardo Leo to a libretto by Antonio Federico Gennaro (d.1744). It was first performed at Naples, Teatro Nuovo. Leo was working on a revision to be entitled La finta Frascatana in 1744 when he died, which was completed by Matteo Capranica.

Cast
La fedeltà odiata Teatro dei Fiorentini 1744
Fazio - fool, lucchese, bass, premiered by Gioacchino Corrado 
Alessandro - young Romano, lover of Eugenia, the enamoured with Camilla,  contralto travesti, premiered by Antonia Colasanti
Camilla - innamorata di Ridolfo, soprano, premiered by Maddalena Frizzi
Vastarella - della villa di Portici, enamoured first with Mosca, then with Fazio, soprano, premiered by Margherita Pozzi  
Eugenia - feigned fraschetana, servant in the house of Alessandro's uncle known as Ninetta, lover of Alessandro  contralto
Ridolfo - young Genovese in love with Eugenia taken for Ninetta, soprano castrato, premiered by Giacomo Ricci
Mosca - old man, napoletano in love with Vastarella, bass, premiered by Girolamo Piani

Recordings
Amor vuol sofferenza Marilyne Fallot, Giovanna Donadini, Marilena Laurenza. Nuova Orchestra Scarlatti di Napoli, Daniele Moles, Nuova Era 3CD

References

1739 operas
Operas by Leonardo Leo
Operas